Philip Rootes Thompson (March 26, 1766July 27, 1837) was an 18th-century and 19th-century politician and lawyer from Virginia.

Born near Fredericksburg in the Colony of Virginia, Thompson was educated by private teachers as a child. He graduated from the College of William and Mary, studied law and was admitted to the bar, commencing practice in Fairfax, Virginia. He was a member of the Virginia House of Delegates from 1793 to 1797 and was elected a Democratic-Republican to the United States House of Representatives in 1800, serving from 1801 to 1807. Afterwards, Thompson continued to practice law until his death on July 27, 1837 in Kanawha County, Virginia (now West Virginia) and was interred in Coals Mouth, Virginia (now St. Albans, West Virginia).

External links

1766 births
1837 deaths
Members of the Virginia House of Delegates
Virginia lawyers
College of William & Mary alumni
People from St. Albans, West Virginia
Politicians from Fredericksburg, Virginia
Democratic-Republican Party members of the United States House of Representatives from Virginia
18th-century American lawyers
18th-century American politicians
19th-century American lawyers
19th-century American politicians
People of pre-statehood West Virginia
Burials in West Virginia